Arunavati river is a seasonal tributary of the Tapi river in India. It originates and flows from the Sangvi village and merges into the Tapi river near Uparpind village in Shirpur tehsil. The river flows mostly in monsoon.

See also
Painganga River
Manora, Washim
Wathod Reservoir

References

Rivers of Maharashtra
Rivers of Madhya Pradesh
Rivers of Gujarat
Gulf of Khambhat
 
Geography of Surat
Rivers of India